The Meister Eckhart Prize is a biennial award consisting of a prize of €50,000 given to "thinkers who produce high-quality work on the subject of identity" by the Identity Foundation. The prize is named after Meister Eckhart (1260–1328), a German theologian, philosopher and mystic.

Award recipients
 2001: Richard Rorty
 2003: Claude Lévi-Strauss
 2005: Ernst Tugendhat
 2007: Amartya Sen
 2009: Amitai Etzioni
 2012: Michel Serres
 2014: Seyla Benhabib

See also
 Meister Eckhart
 List of general awards in the humanities

References

External links
 

Humanities awards
Philosophy awards